Miguel De Grandy (born December 3, 1958) is a Cuban-American lawyer and politician. He served as a Republican member for the 110th and 114th district of the Florida House of Representatives.

De Grandy was born in Havana. He attended the University of Florida, where he earned a bachelor's degree and a Juris Doctor degree. He worked as a lawyer in Coral Gables, Florida. In 1989, De Grandy was elected for the 110th district of the Florida House of Representatives, serving until 1992. he was then representative for the 114th district from 1992 to 1994.

References 

1958 births
Living people
People from Havana
Republican Party members of the Florida House of Representatives
20th-century American politicians
Cuban emigrants to the United States
University of Florida alumni
Florida lawyers
Hispanic and Latino American state legislators in Florida
American politicians of Cuban descent